Indian Airlines Flight 171 was a Caravelle that crashed while attempting an emergency landing at Bombay Airport (now Chhatrapati Shivaji Maharaj International Airport) on 12 October 1976 after suffering an uncontained engine failure, killing all 95 people on board. Metal fatigue in the No. 2 engine's 10th stage high-pressure compressor disk had caused it to disintegrate, the resulting fragments severed fuel lines causing fuel to leak into the engine and ignite causing an uncontrolled fire that eventually affected control surfaces leading to a loss of control.

The crash
Flight 171 was a scheduled domestic passenger flight from Bombay (now Mumbai) to Madras (now Chennai). A Boeing aircraft was originally supposed to make the flight but it developed engine trouble and was replaced with a Sud Aviation Caravelle. Shortly after takeoff from runway 27, Flight 171 suffered a No. 2 engine failure. The crew of Flight 171 immediately turned back to attempt an emergency landing on Bombay Airport's runway 09. Everyone on board Flight 171 perished in the accident.

Cause
A fatigue crack in the tenth stage compressor disc caused a power plant failure which was followed by the bursting of the compressor casing and the cutting of fuel lines that spanned the structure. This caused an intense in-flight fire in the engine bay. It is believed the fire consumed the Caravelle's supply of hydraulic fluid and this was the cause of the aircraft going out of control.

Passengers
Indian actress Rani Chandra died in the accident. Indian actor Jeetendra had planned to board the airliner but cancelled. The actor said that because it was Karwa Chauth, his wife asked him to delay his trip, but Jeetendra decided to head to the airport anyway. After reaching the airport, he realised that the flight was late and decided to go back home to help his wife break her fast. Subsequently, his wife didn't allow him to return to the airport, and hours later he found out that the plane he was supposed to travel in had burst into flames mid-air.

References

External links

1976 in India
Aviation accidents and incidents in 1976
Airliner accidents and incidents caused by in-flight fires
Airliner accidents and incidents caused by mechanical failure
Aviation accidents and incidents in India
Accidents and incidents involving the Sud Aviation Caravelle
171
October 1976 events in Asia
Airliner accidents and incidents involving uncontained engine failure
Airliner accidents and incidents caused by engine failure